The Centaure class was a class of 74-gun ships of the line of the French Navy, comprising four ships, all of which built at Toulon Dockyard to a design dated 28 March 1782 by Joseph-Marie-Blaise Coulomb in the year following the close of the American Revolutionary War. The first pair were ordered on 15 February 1782, and were named on 13 April. This second pair were ordered on 1 June 1782 and named on 21 August. All four ships were destroyed or captured by the British Royal Navy during the French Revolutionary War.

Ships in class

 Centaure
Builder: Toulon
Ordered: 15 February 1782
Begun: 12 May 1782
Launched: 7 November 1782
Completed: December 1782
Fate: Burnt by the British Navy during the evacuation of Toulon on 18 December 1793.

 Heureux
Builder: Toulon
Ordered: 15 February 1782
Begun: 12 May 1782
Launched: 19 December 1782
Completed: April 1783
Fate: Burnt by the British after the Battle of the Nile, 2 August 1798.

 Séduisant
Builder: Toulon
Ordered: 1 June 1782
Begun: August 1782
Launched: 5 July 1783
Completed: 1783
Fate: Wrecked while sailing from Brest, 16 December 1796

 Mercure
Builder: Toulon
Ordered: 1 June 1782
Begun: August 1782
Launched: 4 August 1783
Completed: 1783
Fate: Burnt by the British after the Battle of the Nile, 2 August 1798

References
Demerliac, Cmdt. Alain, Nomenclature des navires français de 1774 a 1792.  Editions ANCRE, Nice.
Winfield, Rif and Roberts, Stephen S. (2017) French Warships in the Age of Sail 1626–1786: Design, Construction, Careers and Fates.. Seaforth Publishing, 2017. .
Winfield, Rif and Roberts, Stephen S. (2015) French Warships in the Age of Sail 1786-1861: Design, Construction, Careers and Fates. Seaforth Publishing. .

 

74-gun ship of the line classes
Ship of the line classes from France
Ship classes of the French Navy